Ruslan Ismailov (born 22 November 1986 in Frunze) is a Kyrgyzstani sport shooter. He competed at the 2008 and 2012 Summer Olympics.  At the 2008 Summer Olympics he competed in the men's 10 metre air rifle, the 50 metre prone rifle and 50 metre rifle three positions (finishing in 39th, 54th and 48th respectively).  At the 2012 Summer Olympics he competed in the men's 10 metre air rifle and the men's 50 metre rifle three positions (finishing in 21st and 40th).

References

External links
 

Kyrgyzstani male sport shooters
1986 births
Living people
Olympic shooters of Kyrgyzstan
Shooters at the 2008 Summer Olympics
Shooters at the 2012 Summer Olympics
Sportspeople from Bishkek
Shooters at the 2006 Asian Games
Shooters at the 2010 Asian Games
Shooters at the 2014 Asian Games
Asian Games competitors for Kyrgyzstan
20th-century Kyrgyzstani people
21st-century Kyrgyzstani people